Patricia Nooroa Taea (born 25 May 1993) is a Cook Island female sprinter who competed in the 100 metres event at the 2012 Summer Olympics. She was ranked 14th in the Preliminaries for the women's 100 metres in a time of 12.47 seconds. She was chosen as torch lighter for the 2009 Pacific Mini Games (together with athlete Daniel Tutai) and flag bearer for the 2014 Commonwealth Games.  She returned to the 2016 Olympics, advancing to the next round of heats.

Personal bests

Achievements

References

External links
 
 

1993 births
Living people
Athletes (track and field) at the 2012 Summer Olympics
Athletes (track and field) at the 2016 Summer Olympics
Cook Island female sprinters
Olympic athletes of the Cook Islands
Cook Island Latter Day Saints
Commonwealth Games competitors for the Cook Islands
Athletes (track and field) at the 2010 Commonwealth Games
Athletes (track and field) at the 2014 Commonwealth Games
Athletes (track and field) at the 2018 Commonwealth Games
World Athletics Championships athletes for the Cook Islands
People from Rarotonga
Olympic female sprinters